The 2011 DEKALB Superspiel was held on March 17–21 at the Morris Curling Club in Morris, Manitoba. The event featured 16 men's teams and 12 women's teams competing for a total purse of CAD$54,000. In the men's final, Kevin Koe of Alberta defeated Mike McEwen in an extra end, while Chelsea Carey defeated Michelle Montford in the women's final.

Men

Teams

Results

A Event

B Event

C Event

Playoffs

Women

Teams

Results

A Event

B Event

C Event

Playoffs

External links
WCT Men's Event Page
WCT Women's Event Page

2011 in Canadian curling
Curling in Manitoba
2011 in Manitoba